Malacopterus tenellus is a species of beetle in the family Cerambycidae. It was described by Johan Christian Fabricius in 1801.

References

Oemini
Beetles described in 1801